Scott Township, Iowa may refer to one of the following places:

 Scott Township, Buena Vista County, Iowa
 Scott Township, Fayette County, Iowa
 Scott Township, Floyd County, Iowa
 Scott Township, Franklin County, Iowa
 Scott Township, Fremont County, Iowa
 Scott Township, Hamilton County, Iowa, Hamilton County, Iowa
 Scott Township, Henry County, Iowa, Henry County, Iowa
 Scott Township, Johnson County, Iowa
 Scott Township, Madison County, Iowa
 Scott Township, Mahaska County, Iowa, Mahaska County, Iowa
 Scott Township, Montgomery County, Iowa
 Scott Township, Poweshiek County, Iowa, Poweshiek County, Iowa

See also

Scott Township (disambiguation)

Iowa township disambiguation pages